The Oswestry Disability Index (ODI) is an index derived from the Oswestry Low Back Pain Questionnaire used by clinicians and researchers to quantify disability for low back pain.

This validated questionnaire was first published by Jeremy Fairbank et al. in Physiotherapy in 1980. The current version was published in the journal Spine in 2000.

The self-completed questionnaire contains ten topics concerning intensity of pain, lifting, ability to care for oneself, ability to walk, ability to sit, sexual function, ability to stand, social life, sleep quality, and ability to travel. Each topic category is followed by 6 statements describing different potential scenarios in the patient's life relating to the topic. The patient then checks the statement which most closely resembles their situation. Each question is scored on a scale of 0–5 with the first statement being zero and indicating the least amount of disability and the last statement is scored 5 indicating most severe disability. The scores for all questions answered are summed, then multiplied by two to obtain the index (range 0 to 100). Zero is equated with no disability and 100 is the maximum disability possible.

Scoring
 0% –20%: Minimal disability
 21%–40%: Moderate Disability
 41%–60%: Severe Disability
 61%–80%: Crippling back pain
 81%–100%: These patients are either bed-bound or have an exaggeration of their symptoms.

References

External links
 MAPI Research Trust site with information about licensing, along with access to a review copy of the questionnaire
Medical scoring system
Medical diagnosis
Bones of the vertebral column
Pain scales